Obsteig is a municipality in the Imst district and is located 15 km northeast of Imst and 3 km above Mötz. The village has 14 parts and is a popular area for skiing. Main sources of income is Winter tourism.

Population

References

External links

Cities and towns in Imst District